Comprégnac is a commune in the Aveyron department in southern France.

The village of Peyre is part of the commune of Comprégnac. It belongs to The most beautiful villages of France association.

Population

See also
Communes of the Aveyron department

References

Communes of Aveyron
Aveyron communes articles needing translation from French Wikipedia